Yitro, Yithro, Yisroi, Yisrau, or Yisro (Hebrew for the name "Jethro," the second word and first distinctive word in the parashah) is the seventeenth weekly Torah portion (parashah) in the annual Jewish cycle of Torah reading and the fifth in the Book of Exodus. The parashah tells of Jethro's organizational counsel to Moses and God's revelation of the Ten Commandments to the Israelites at Mount Sinai.

The parashah constitutes . The parashah is the shortest of the weekly Torah portions in the Book of Exodus and is also one of the shortest parashot in the Torah. It is made up of 4,022 Hebrew letters, 1,105 Hebrew words, and 75 verses.

Jews read it the seventeenth Sabbath after Simchat Torah, generally in January or February. Jews also read part of the parashah, as a Torah reading on the first day of the Jewish holiday of Shavuot, which commemorates the giving of the Ten Commandments.

Readings 

First reading — Exodus 18:1–12

In the first reading (aliyah), Moses' father-in-law Jethro heard all that God had done for the Israelites and brought Moses' wife Zipporah and her two sons Gershom ("I have been a stranger here") and Eliezer ("God was my help") to Moses in the wilderness at Mount Sinai. Jethro rejoiced, blessed God, and offered sacrifices to God.

Second reading — Exodus 18:13–23
In the second reading (aliyah), the people stood from morning until evening waiting for Moses to adjudicate their disputes. Jethro counseled Moses to make known the law, and then choose capable, trustworthy, God-fearing men to serve as chiefs to judge the people, bringing only the most difficult matters to Moses.

Third reading — Exodus 18:24–27
In the short third reading (aliyah), Moses heeded Jethro's advice. Then Moses bade Jethro farewell, and Jethro went home.

Fourth reading — Exodus 19:1–6
In the fourth reading (aliyah), three months to the day after the Israelites left Egypt, they entered the wilderness at the foot of Mount Sinai. Moses went up Mount Sinai, and God told him to tell the Israelites that if they would obey God faithfully and keep God's covenant, they would be God's treasured possession, a kingdom of priests, and a holy nation.

Fifth reading — Exodus 19:7–19
In the fifth reading (aliyah), when Moses told the elders, all the people answered: "All that the Lord has spoken we will do!" and Moses brought the people's words back to God. God instructed Moses to have the people stay pure, wash their clothes, and prepare for the third day, when God would come down in the sight of the people, on Mount Sinai. God told Moses to set bounds around the mountain, threatening whoever touched the mountain with death, and Moses did so.

At dawn of the third day, there was thunder, lightning, a dense cloud upon the mountain, and a very loud blast of the horn. Moses led the people to the foot of the mountain. Mount Sinai was all in smoke, the mountain trembled violently, the blare of the horn grew louder and louder, and God answered Moses in thunder.

Sixth reading — Exodus 19:20–20:14
In the sixth reading (aliyah), God came down on the top of Mount Sinai, and called Moses up. God again commanded Moses to warn the people not to break through.

God spoke the Ten Commandments:
 "I the Lord am your God."
 "You shall have no other gods besides Me. You shall not make for yourself a sculptured image, or any likeness of what is in the heavens above, or on the earth below, or in the waters under the earth. You shall not bow down to them or serve them."
 "You shall not swear falsely by the name of the Lord your God."
 "Remember the Sabbath day and keep it holy."
 "Honor your father and your mother."
 "You shall not murder."
 "You shall not commit adultery."
 "You shall not steal."
 "You shall not bear false witness."
 "You shall not covet . . . anything that is your neighbor's."

Seventh reading — Exodus 20:15–23
In the seventh reading (aliyah), seeing the thunder, lightning, and the mountain smoking, the people fell back and asked Moses to speak to them instead of God. God told Moses to tell the people not make any gods of silver or gold, but an altar of earth for sacrifices. God prohibited hewing the stones to make a stone altar. And God prohibited ascending the altar by steps, so as not to exposed the priests' nakedness.

Readings according to the triennial cycle
Jews who read the Torah according to the triennial cycle of Torah reading may read the parashah according to a different schedule. Some congregations that read the Torah according to the triennial cycle read the parashah in three divisions with the Ten Commandments in years two and three, while other congregations that read the Torah according to the triennial cycle nonetheless read the entire parashah with Ten Commandments every year.

In ancient parallels
The parashah has parallels in these ancient sources:

Exodus chapter 20
The early third millennium BCE Sumerian wisdom text Instructions of Shuruppak contains maxims that parallel the Ten Commandments, including:
Don't steal anything; don't kill yourself! . . .
My son, don't commit murder . . .

Don't laugh with a girl if she is married; the slander (arising from it) is strong! . . .
Don't plan lies; it is discrediting . . .
Don't speak fraudulently; in the end it will bind you like a trap.

Noting that Sargon of Akkad was the first to use a seven-day week, Gregory Aldrete speculated that the Israelites may have adopted the idea from the Akkadian Empire.

In inner-biblical interpretation
The parashah has parallels or is discussed in these Biblical sources:

Exodus chapter 20

The Sabbath
 refers to the Sabbath. Commentators note that the Hebrew Bible repeats the commandment to observe the Sabbath 12 times.

 reports that on the seventh day of Creation, God finished God's work, rested, and blessed and hallowed the seventh day.

The Sabbath is one of the Ten Commandments.  commands that one remember the Sabbath day, keep it holy, and not do any manner of work or cause anyone under one's control to work, for in six days God made heaven and earth and rested on the seventh day, blessed the Sabbath, and hallowed it.  commands that one observe the Sabbath day, keep it holy, and not do any manner of work or cause anyone under one's control to work — so that one's subordinates might also rest — and remember that the Israelites were servants in the land of Egypt, and God brought them out with a mighty hand and by an outstretched arm.

And God told Moses to let no one go out of one's place on the seventh day.

In , just before giving Moses the second Tablets of Stone, God commanded that the Israelites keep and observe the Sabbath throughout their generations, as a sign between God and the children of Israel forever, for in six days God made heaven and earth, and on the seventh day God rested.

In , just before issuing the instructions for the Tabernacle, Moses again told the Israelites that no one should work on the Sabbath, specifying that one must not kindle fire on the Sabbath.

In , God told Moses to repeat the Sabbath commandment to the people, calling the Sabbath a holy convocation.

The prophet Isaiah taught in  that iniquity is inconsistent with the Sabbath. In , the prophet taught that if people turn away from pursuing or speaking of business on the Sabbath and call the Sabbath a delight, then God will make them ride upon the high places of the earth and will feed them with the heritage of Jacob.

The prophet Jeremiah taught in  that the fate of Jerusalem depended on whether the people abstained from work on the Sabbath, refraining from carrying burdens outside their houses and through the city gates.

The prophet Ezekiel told in  how God gave the Israelites God's Sabbaths, to be a sign between God and them, but the Israelites rebelled against God by profaning the Sabbaths, provoking God to pour out God's fury upon them, but God stayed God's hand.

In , Nehemiah told how he saw some treading winepresses on the Sabbath, and others bringing all manner of burdens into Jerusalem on the Sabbath day, so when it began to be dark before the Sabbath, he commanded that the city gates be shut and not opened till after the Sabbath and directed the Levites to keep the gates to sanctify the Sabbath.

The Altar

In early nonrabbinic interpretation
The parashah has parallels or is discussed in these early nonrabbinic sources:

Exodus chapter 20

The Sabbath
 told how in the 2nd century BCE, many followers of the pious Jewish priest Mattathias rebelled against the Seleucid king Antiochus IV Epiphanes. Antiochus's soldiers attacked a group of them on the Sabbath, and when the Pietists failed to defend themselves so as to honor the Sabbath (commanded in, among other places), a thousand died.  reported that when Mattathias and his friends heard, they reasoned that if they did not fight on the Sabbath, they would soon be destroyed. So they decided that they would fight against anyone who attacked them on the Sabbath.

In classical rabbinic interpretation
The parashah is discussed in these rabbinic sources from the era of the Mishnah and the Talmud:

Exodus chapter 18

The Tannaim debated what news Jethro heard in  that caused him to adopt the faith of Moses. Rabbi Joshua said that Jethro heard of the Israelites' victory over the Amalekites, as  reports the results of that battle immediately before  reports Jethro's hearing of the news. Rabbi Eleazar of Modim said that Jethro heard of the giving of the Torah, for when God gave Israel the Torah, the sound travelled from one end of the earth to the other, and all the world's kings trembled in their palaces and sang, as Psalm  reports, "The voice of the Lord makes the hinds to tremble . . . and in His temple all say: 'Glory.'" The kings then converged upon Balaam and asked him what the tumultuous noise was that they had heard — perhaps another flood, or perhaps a flood of fire. Balaam told them that God had a precious treasure in store, which God had hidden for 974 generations before the creation of the world, and God desired to give it to God's children, as  says, "The Lord will give strength to His people." Immediately they all exclaimed the balance of  "The Lord will bless His people with peace." Rabbi Eleazar said that Jethro heard about the dividing of the Reed Sea, as  reports, "And it came to pass, when all the kings of the Amorites heard how the Lord had dried up the waters of the Jordan before the children of Israel," and Rahab the harlot too told Joshua's spies in  "For we have heard how the Lord dried up the water of the Red Sea."

Rabbi Joshua interpreted  to teach that Jethro sent a messenger to Moses. Noting that  mentions each of Jethro, Zipporah, and Moses' children, Rabbi Eliezer taught that Jethro sent Moses a letter asking Moses to come out to meet Jethro for Jethro's sake; and should Moses be unwilling to do so for Jethro's sake, then to do so for the Zipporah's sake; and should Moses be reluctant to do so for her sake, then to do so the sake of Moses' children.

Reading , "Moses sat to judge the people from the morning to the evening," the Mekhilta of Rabbi Ishmael questioned whether Moses really sat as a judge that long. For  says, "from the morning to the evening," and  says, "And there was evening and there was morning."

Aaron really intended to delay the people until Moses came down, but Moses thought that Aaron was participating in the sin and was incensed with him. So God told Moses that God knew that Aaron's intentions were good. The Midrash compared it to a prince who became mentally unstable and started digging to undermine his father's house. His tutor told him not to weary himself but to let him dig. When the king saw it, he said that he knew the tutor's intentions were good, and declared that the tutor would rule over the palace. And Aaron told them that since he was a priest, they should let him make it and sacrifice to it, all with the intention of delaying them until Moses could come down. So God told Aaron that God knew Aaron's intention, and that only Aaron would have sovereignty over the sacrifices that the Israelites would bring. The Midrash told that God told this to Moses several months later in the Tabernacle itself when Moses was about to consecrate Aaron to his office. Rabbi Levi compared it to the friend of a king who was a member of the imperial cabinet and a judge. When the king was about to appoint a palace governor, he told his friend that he intended to appoint the friend's brother. And when God was about to appoint a High Priest, God notified Moses that it would be his brother Aaron.

Rabbi Berekiah taught in the name of Rabbi Hanina that judges must possess seven qualities, and  enumerates four: "Moreover you shall provide out of all the people able men, such as fear God, men of truth, hating unjust gain." And  mentions the other three: They must be "wise men, and understanding, and full of knowledge." Scripture does not state all seven qualities together to teach that if people possessing all the seven qualities are not available, then those possessing four are selected; if people possessing four qualities are not available, then those possessing three are selected; and if even these are not available, then those possessing one quality are selected, for as  says, "A woman of valor who can find?"

Exodus chapter 19
The Mekhilta of Rabbi Ishmael deduced from the use of the singular form of the verb "encamped" (vayichan) in  that all the Israelites agreed and were of one mind.

Noting that  reports, "they encamped in the desert," the Mekhilta of Rabbi Ishmael taught that the Torah was given openly, in a public place, for if it had been given in the Land of Israel, the Israelites could say to the nations of the world that they had no portion in it. But it was given openly, in a public place, and all who want to take it may come and take it. It was not given at night, as  reports, "And it was on the third day, when it was morning . . . ." It was not given in silence, as  reports, "and there were thunders and lightnings." It was not given inaudibly, as  reports, "And all the people saw the thunders and the lightnings."

A Midrash taught that God created the world so that the upper realms should be for the upper beings, and the lower realms for the lower, as  says, "The heavens are the heavens of the Lord, but the earth has He given to the children of men." Then Moses changed the earthly into heavenly and the heavenly into earthly, for as  reports, "Moses went up to God," and then  reports, "The Lord came down upon Mount Sinai."

And the Mekhilta of Rabbi Ishmael further deduced from  that the Israelites traveled from Rameses to Succoth in the twinkling of an eye.

Eagles, however, fear only people who might shoot arrows at them from below. Eagles, therefore, prefer that the arrows hit them rather than their children. The Mekhilta of Rabbi Ishmael compared this to a man who walked on the road with his son in front of him. If robbers, who might seek to capture his son, come from in front, the man puts his son behind him. If a wolf comes from behind, the man puts his son in front of him. If robbers come from in front and wolves from behind, the man puts his son on his shoulders. As  says, "You have seen how the Lord your God bore you, as a man bears his son."

Reading , a Midrash taught that God did not conduct God's Self with the Israelites in the usual manner. For usually when one acquired servants, it was on the understanding that the servants drew the master's carriage.

A Midrash likened God to a bridegroom and Israel to a bride, and taught that  reports that God betrothed Israel at Sinai. The Midrash noted that the Rabbis taught that documents of betrothal and marriage are written only with the consent of both parties, and the bridegroom pays the scribe's fee. And  reports that Moses wrote the document, saying, "And Moses wrote this law." The Midrash then taught that God compensated Moses for writing the document by giving him a lustrous countenance, as  reports, "Moses did not know that the skin of his face sent forth beams."

In the Pirke De-Rabbi Eliezer, Rabbi Ḥanina told that in the third month, the day is double the night, and the Israelites slept until two hours of the day, for sleep on the day of the feast of Shavuot is pleasant, as the night is short. Moses went to the camp and aroused the Israelites from their sleep, for God desired to give them the Torah.  says, "And Moses brought forth the people out of the camp to meet God," and God also went forth to meet them, like a bridegroom who goes forth to meet his bride.

The Gemara cited  to explain how Moses decided to abstain from marital relations so as to remain pure for his communication with God. A Baraita taught that Moses did three things of his own understanding, and God approved: (1) Moses added one day of abstinence of his own understanding; (2) he separated himself from his wife (entirely, after the Revelation); and (3) he broke the Tablets of Stone (on which God had written the Ten Commandments). The Gemara explained that to reach his decision to separate himself from his wife, Moses applied an a fortiori (kal va-chomer) argument to himself. Moses reasoned that if he heard from the Shechinah at all times and not only at one appointed time, how much more so should he abstain from marital contact.

The Mishnah deduced from  that a woman who emits semen on the third day after intercourse is unclean.

The "ladder" in Jacob's dream symbolizes Mount Sinai. That the ladder is "set upon (mutzav) the earth" recalls , which says, "And they stood (vayityatzvu) at the nether part of the mount." "And behold the angels of God" alludes to Moses and Aaron. "Ascending" parallels  "And Moses went up to God." "And descending" parallels  "And Moses went down from the mount." And the words "and, behold, the Lord stood beside him" in  parallel the words of  "And the Lord came down upon Mount Sinai."

Rabbi Levi addressed the question that  raises: "Did ever a people hear the voice of God speaking out of the midst of the fire, as you have heard, and live?" Rabbi Levi taught that the world would not have been able to survive hearing the voice of God in God's power, but instead, as  says, "The voice of the Lord is with power." That is, the voice of God came according to the power of each individual — young, old, or infant — to receive it.

Thus the Mekhilta of Rabbi Ishmael noted that  (20:19 in NJPS) says: "You yourselves have seen that I have talked with you from heaven," and deduced that God bent down the heavens, lowering them to the top of the mountain, and spread the heavens as a person spreads a mattress on a bed, and spoke from the heavens as a person would speak from the top of a mattress.

Rabbi Joshua ben Levi taught that when Moses ascended on high (as  reports), the ministering angels asked God what business one born of woman had among them. God told them that Moses had come to receive the Torah. The angels questioned why God was giving to flesh and blood the secret treasure that God had hidden for 974 generations before God created the world. God told Moses to answer the angels. Moses asked God what was written in the Torah. In , God said, "I am the Lord your God, Who brought you out of the Land of Egypt." So Moses asked the angels whether the angels had gone down to Egypt or were enslaved to Pharaoh. As the angels had not, Moses asked them why then God should give them the Torah. Again,  says, "You shall have no other gods," so Moses asked the angels whether they lived among peoples that engage in idol worship. Again,  (20:8 in NJPS) says, "Remember the Sabbath day, to keep it holy," so Moses asked the angels whether they performed work from which they needed to rest. Again,  (20:7 in NJPS) says, "You shall not take the name of the Lord your God in vain," so Moses asked the angels whether there were any business dealings among them in which they might swear oaths. Again,  (20:12 in NJPS) says, "Honor your father and your mother," so Moses asked the angels whether they had fathers and mothers. Again,  (20:13 in NJPS) says, "You shall not murder; you shall not commit adultery; you shall not steal," so Moses asked the angels whether there was jealousy among them and whether the Evil Tempter was among them. Immediately, the angels conceded that God's plan was correct, and each angel felt moved to love Moses and give him gifts. Even the Angel of Death confided his secret to Moses, and that is how Moses knew what to do when, as  reports, Moses told Aaron what to do to make atonement for the people, to stand between the dead and the living, and to check the plague.

Exodus chapter 20

In the Pirke De-Rabbi Eliezer, Rabbi Tarfon taught that God came from Mount Sinai (or others say Mount Seir) and was revealed to the children of Esau, as  says, "The Lord came from Sinai, and rose from Seir to them," and "Seir" means the children of Esau, as  says, "And Esau dwelt in Mount Seir." God asked them whether they would accept the Torah, and they asked what was written in it. From there, God turned and was revealed to the children of Ishmael, as  says, "He shined forth from Mount Paran," and "Paran" means the children of Ishmael, as  says of Ishmael, "And he dwelt in the wilderness of Paran." God asked them whether they would accept the Torah, and they asked what was written in it. From there, God sent messengers to all the nations of the world asking them whether they would accept the Torah, and they asked what was written in it. They replied that they had no delight in the Torah, therefore let God give it to God's people, as  says, "The Lord will give strength [identified with the Torah] to His people; the Lord will bless His people with peace." From there, God returned and was revealed to the children of Israel, as  says, "And he came from the ten thousands of holy ones," and the expression "ten thousands" means the children of Israel, as  says, "And when it rested, he said, 'Return, O Lord, to the ten thousands of the thousands of Israel.'" With God were thousands of chariots and 20,000 angels, and God's right hand held the Torah, as  says, "At his right hand was a fiery law to them."

Reading , "And God spoke all these words, saying," the Mekhilta of Rabbi Ishmael taught that God spoke the ten commandments in one utterance, in a manner of speech of which human beings are incapable.

Rabbi Joshua ben Levi taught that with every single word that God spoke (as  reports), the Israelites' souls departed, as Song of Songs  says: "My soul went forth when He spoke." But if their souls departed at the first word, how could they receive the second word? God revived them with the dew with which God will resurrect the dead, as  says, "You, O God, did send a plentiful rain; You did confirm your inheritance, when it was weary." Rabbi Joshua ben Levi also taught that with every word that God spoke, the Israelites retreated a distance of 12 mils, but the ministering angels led them back, as  says, "The hosts of angels march, they march (yiddodun yiddodun)." Instead of yiddodun ("they march"), Rabbi Joshua ben Levi read yedaddun ("they lead").

And a Midrash compared "I am the Lord your God" to a princess who having been taken captive by robbers, was rescued by a king, who subsequently asked her to marry him. Replying to his proposal, she asked what dowry the king would give her, to which the king replied that it was enough that he had rescued her from the robbers. (So God's delivery of the Israelites from Egypt was enough reason for the Israelites to obey God's commandments.)

The Mishnah taught that the priests recited the Ten Commandments daily. The Gemara, however, taught that although the Sages wanted to recite the Ten Commandments along with the Shema in precincts outside of the Temple, they soon abolished their recitation, because the Sages did not want to lend credence to the arguments of the heretics (who might argue that Jews honored only the Ten Commandments).

Rabbi Ishmael taught that Scripture speaks in particular of idolatry, for  says, "Because he has despised the word of the Lord." You shall have no other gods before Me."

Rabbi Simlai expounded that a total of 613 commandments were communicated to Moses — 365 negative commandments, corresponding to the number of days in the solar year, and 248 positive commandments, corresponding to the number of the parts in the human body. The letters of the word "Torah" have a numerical value of 611 (as  equals 400,  equals 6,  equals 200, and  equals 5). And the Gemara did not count among the commandments that the Israelites heard from Moses the commandments, "I am the Lord your God," and, "You shall have no other gods before Me," as the Israelites heard those commandments directly from God.

The Sifre taught that to commit idolatry is to deny the entire Torah.

The Mishnah taught that those who engaged in idol worship were executed, whether they served it, sacrificed to it, offered it incense, made libations to it, prostrated themselves to it, accepted it as a god, or said to it "You are my god."

The Gemara reconciled apparently discordant verses touching on vicarious responsibility. The Gemara noted that  states: "The fathers shall not be put to death for the children, neither shall the children be put to death for the fathers; every man shall be put to death for his own sin," but  (20:5 in NJPS) says: "visiting the iniquity of the fathers upon the children." The Gemara then questioned whether the words "they shall stumble one upon another" in  do not teach that one will stumble through the sin of the other, that all are held responsible for one another. The Gemara answered that the vicarious responsibility of which  speaks is limited to those who have the power to restrain their fellow from evil but do not do so.

The Mishnah taught that a donkey could go out with a saddle cushion tied to it, rams strapped, ewes covered, and goats with their udders tied. Rabbi Jose forbade all these, except covering ewes. Rabbi Judah allowed goats to go out with their udders tied to dry, but not to save their milk. The Mishnah taught that animals could not go out with a pad tied to their tails. A driver could not tie camels together and pull one of them, but a driver could take the leads of several camels in hand and pull them. The Mishnah prohibited donkeys with untied cushions, bells, ladder–shaped yokes, or thongs around their feet; fowls with ribbons or leg straps; rams with wagons; ewes protected by wood chips in their noses; calves with little yokes; and cows with hedgehog skins or straps between their horns. The Mishnah reported that Rabbi Eleazar ben Azariah's cow used to go out with a thong between its horns, but without the consent of the Rabbis.

The Gemara reported that on the eve of the Sabbath before sunset, Rabbi Simeon ben Yochai and his son saw an old man running with two bundles of myrtle and asked him what they were for. The old man explained that they were to bring a sweet smell to his house in honor of the Sabbath. Rabbi Simeon ben Yochai asked whether one bundle would not be enough. Rabbi Simeon ben Yochai told his son to mark how precious the commandments are to Israel.

Similarly, the Midrash quoted , in which Job said, "The stranger did not lodge in the street" (that is, none were denied hospitality), to show that God disqualifies no creature, but receives all; the city gates were open all the time and anyone could enter them. Thus the Midrash taught that these verses reflect the Divine example of accepting all creatures.

The Midrash quoted , in which Job said, "The stranger did not lodge in the street" (that is, none were denied hospitality), to show that God disqualifies no one, but receives all; the city gates were open all the time and anyone could enter them. Thus these verses reflect the Divine example of accepting all. The Midrash taught that strangers will one day partake of the showbread, because their daughters will be married into the priesthood.

The Mishnah taught that every act that violates the law of the Sabbath also violates the law of a festival, except that one may prepare food on a festival but not on the Sabbath.

The Alphabet of Rabbi Akiva taught that when God was giving Israel the Torah, God told them that if they accepted the Torah and observed God's commandments, then God would give them for eternity a most precious thing that God possessed — the World To Come. When Israel asked to see in this world an example of the World To Come, God replied that the Sabbath is an example of the World To Come.

A Midrash asked to which commandment  refers when it says, "For if you shall diligently keep all this commandment that I command you, to do it, to love the Lord your God, to walk in all His ways, and to cleave to Him, then will the Lord drive out all these nations from before you, and you shall dispossess nations greater and mightier than yourselves." Rabbi Levi said that "this commandment" refers to the recitation of the Shema, but the Rabbis said that it refers to the Sabbath, which is equal to all the precepts of the Torah.

The Mishnah taught that both men and women are obligated to carry out all commandments concerning their fathers. Rav Judah interpreted the Mishnah to mean that both men and women are bound to perform all precepts concerning a father that are incumbent upon a son to perform for his father.

A Midrash noted that almost everywhere, Scripture mentions a father's honor before the mother's honor. (See, for example,  (20:12 in NJPS),  (5:16 in NJPS), .) But  mentions the mother first to teach that one should honor both parents equally.

It was taught in a Baraita that Judah the Prince said that God knows that a son honors his mother more than his father, because the mother wins him over with words. God knows that a son fears his father more than his mother, because the father teaches him Torah. Therefore, (in ) God put the fear of the mother before that of the father.

To "revere" means that the child must neither stand nor sit in the parent's place, nor contradict the parent's words, nor engage in a dispute to which the parent is a party. To "honor" means that the child must give the parent food and drink and clothes, and take the parent in and out.

Noting that  (20:12 in NJPS) commands, "Honor your father and your mother," and  directs, "Honor the Lord with your substance," the Rabbis taught in a Baraita that Scripture thus likens the honor due to parents to that due to God. Similarly, as  commands, "You shall fear your father and mother," and  commands, "The Lord your God you shall fear and you shall serve," Scripture likens the fear of parents to the fear of God. And as  commands, "He that curses his father or his mother shall surely be put to death," and  commands, "Whoever curses his God shall bear his sin," Scripture likens cursing parents to cursing God. But the Baraita conceded that with respect to striking (which  addresses with regard to parents), that it is certainly impossible (with respect to God). The Baraita concluded that these comparisons between parents and God are only logical, since the three (God, the mother, and the father) are partners in creation of the child. For the Rabbis taught in a Baraita that there are three partners in the creation of a person — God, the father, and the mother. When one honors one's father and mother, God considers it as if God had dwelt among them and they had honored God. And a Tanna taught before Rav Nachman that when one vexes one's father and mother, God considers it right not to dwell among them, for had God dwelt among them, they would have vexed God.

The Mishnah taught that one who intended to kill an animal but killed a person instead was not liable for murder. One was not liable for murder who intended to kill an unviable fetus and killed a viable child. One was not liable for murder who intended to strike the victim on the loins, where the blow was insufficient to kill, but struck the heart instead, where it was sufficient to kill, and the victim died. One was not liable for murder who intended to strike the victim on the heart, where it was enough to kill, but struck the victim on the loins, where it was not, and yet the victim died.

If, however, you transgress the commandment, then (in God's words in ) "I will draw out the sword after you."

The Gemara harmonized the two positions by concluding that Rabbi Josiah referred to the prohibition for abduction, while Rabbi Johanan referred to the prohibition for selling a kidnapped person. Similarly, the Rabbis taught in a Baraita that  (20:13 in NJPS), "You shall not steal," refers to the stealing of human beings. To the potential objection that  (20:13 in NJPS) refers to property theft, the Baraita responded that one of the thirteen principles by which we interpret the Torah is that a law is interpreted by its general context, and the Ten Commandments speak of capital crimes (like murder and adultery). (Thus "You shall not steal" must refer to a capital crime and thus to kidnapping.) Another Baraita taught that the words "You shall not steal" in  refer to theft of property. To the potential objection that  refers to the theft of human beings, the Baraita responded that the general context of  speaks of money matters; therefore  must refer to monetary theft.

But the Mekhilta of Rabbi Ishmael noted that  says, "You shall not covet the silver or the gold that is on them, nor take it for yourself." And the Mekhilta of Rabbi Ishmael reasoned that just as in  the word "covet" applies only to prohibit the carrying out of one's desire into practice, so also  (20:14 in NJPS) prohibits only the carrying out of one's desire into practice.

The Mekhilta of Rabbi Simeon taught that the differing terms mean that one can incur liability for desiring in and of itself and for coveting in and of itself.

But Rabbi Akiva said that they saw and heard what was perceivable, and they saw the fiery word of God strike the tablets.

The Gemara taught that  (20:17 in NJPS) sets forth one of the three most distinguishing virtues of the Jewish People. The Gemara taught that David told the Gibeonites that the Israelites are distinguished by three characteristics: They are merciful, bashful, and benevolent. They are merciful, for  says that God would "show you (the Israelites) mercy, and have compassion upon you, and multiply you." And they are benevolent, for  says of Abraham "that he may command his children and his household after him, that they may keep the way of the Lord, to do righteousness and justice." The Gemara taught that David told the Gibeonites that only one who cultivates these three characteristics is fit to join the Jewish People.

Reading , Rabbi Levi taught that blessed actions bless those who are responsible for them, and cursed actions curse those who are responsible for them. Conversely, the Midrash read  to teach, "You shall not have possessions if there are in your bag diverse weights, a great and a small. You shall not have possessions if there are in your house diverse measures, a great and a small." Thus, if one does employ deceitful measures, one will not have anything to take or give, to buy or sell. The Midrash taught that God tells businesspeople that they "may not make" one measure great and another small, but if they do, they "will not make" a profit.

The Mishnah told that the stones of the Temple's altar and ramp came from the valley of Beit Kerem. A stone was also unfit if it was chipped through any means. They whitewashed the walls and top of the altar twice a year, on Passover and Sukkot, and they whitewashed the vestibule once a year, on Passover. Rabbi (Judah the Patriarch) said that they cleaned them with a cloth every Friday because of blood stains. They did not apply the whitewash with an iron trowel, out of the concern that the iron trowel would touch the stones and render them unfit, for iron was created to shorten humanity's days, and the altar was created to extend humanity's days, and it is not proper that that which shortens humanity's days be placed on that which extends humanity's days.

The Tosefta reported that Rabban Joḥanan ben Zakkai said that  singled out iron, of all metals, to be invalid for use in building the altar because one can make a sword from it. The sword is a sign of punishment, and the altar is a sign of atonement. They thus kept that which is a sign of punishment away from that which is a sign of atonement. Because stones, which do not hear or speak, bring atonement between Israel and God,  says, "you shall lift up no iron tool upon them." So children of Torah, who atone for the world — how much more should no force of injury come near to them. Similarly,  says, "You shall build the altar of the Lord your God of unhewn stones." Because the stones of the altar secure the bond between Israel and God, God said that they should be whole before God. Children of Torah, who are whole for all time — how much more should they be deemed whole (and not wanting) before God.

And thus, "the Lord appear to him."

Bar Kappara taught that every dream has its interpretation. Thus Bar Kappara taught that the "ladder" in Jacob's dream of  symbolizes the stairway leading up to the altar in the Temple in Jerusalem. "And the top of it reached to heaven" implies the sacrifices, the odor of which ascended to heaven. "The angels of God" symbolize the High Priests. "Ascending and descending on it" describes the priests ascending and descending the stairway of the altar.

In medieval Jewish interpretation
The parashah is discussed in these medieval Jewish sources:

Exodus chapter 18
An effort should be made that they be white-haired, of impressive height, of dignified appearance, and people who understand whispered matters and who understand many different languages so that the court will not need to hear testimony from an interpreter. Maimonides taught that one need not demand that a judge for a court of three possess all these qualities, but a judge must, however, possess seven attributes: wisdom, humility, fear of God, loathing for money, love for truth, being beloved by people at large, and a good reputation. Maimonides cited , "Men of wisdom and understanding," for the requirement of wisdom.  continues, "Beloved by your tribes," which Maimonides read to refer to those who are appreciated by people at large. Maimonides taught that what will make them beloved by people is conducting themselves with a favorable eye and a humble spirit, being good company, and speaking and conducting their business with people gently. Maimonides read , "men of power," to refer to people who are mighty in their observance of the commandments, who are very demanding of themselves, and who overcome their evil inclination until they possess no unfavorable qualities, no trace of an unpleasant reputation, even during their early adulthood, they were spoken of highly. Maimonides read , "men of power," also to imply that they should have a courageous heart to save the oppressed from the oppressor, as  reports, "And Moses arose and delivered them." Maimonides taught that just as Moses was humble, so, too, every judge should be humble.  continues "God-fearing," which is clear.  mentions "men who hate profit," which Maimonides took to refer to people who do not become overly concerned even about their own money; they do not pursue the accumulation of money, for anyone who is overly concerned about wealth will ultimately be overcome by want.  continues "men of truth," which Maimonides took to refer to people who pursue justice because of their own inclination; they love truth, hate crime, and flee from all forms of crookedness.

Exodus chapter 19
Baḥya ibn Paquda posited that that people's obligation to render service is proportionate to the degree of benefit that they receive. In every period, events single out one people from all others for special benefits from God. That people then has a special obligation to render additional service to God beyond that required of other peoples. There is no way of determining by the intellect alone what that service should be. Thus, God chose the Israelites from among other nations by bringing them out of Egypt, dividing the Sea, and bestowing other benefits. Correspondingly, God singled out the Jews for service so that they can express their gratitude to God; and, in return for their acceptance of this service, God has assured them a reward in this world and in the next. All this, Baḥya argued, can only be clearly made known by the Torah, as  says, "You have seen what I did unto the Egyptians and how I bore you on eagles' wings, and brought you unto Myself. Now, therefore, if you will obey My voice indeed, and keep My covenant, then you shall be a treasure to Me above all people and you shall be to Me a kingdom of priests and a holy nation."

Exodus chapter 20

Maimonides taught that the violation of this commandment was not punished by lashes, because it does not involve a deed. Maimonides taught that a person does not violate  (20:14 in NJPS) until the person actually takes the article that the person covets, as reflected by  "Do not covet the gold and silver on these statues and take it for yourself." Maimonides taught that a person who desires a home, a spouse, utensil, or anything else belonging to a colleague that the person can acquire violates a negative commandment when the person thinks in the person's heart how it might be possible to acquire this thing from the colleague. Maimonides read  (5:18 in NJPS), "Do not desire," to refer even to feelings in the heart alone. Thus, a person who desires another person's property violates one negative commandment. A person who purchases an object the person desires after pressuring the owners and repeatedly asking them, violates two negative commandments. And if the person takes the article by robbery, the person violates three negative commandments.

Baḥya reasoned that the closer the murdered is to the murderer, the more the punishment should be severe, and thus the punishment for those who kill themselves will undoubtedly be very great. Baḥya taught that for that reason, people should not recklessly endanger their lives.

Abravanel deduced that  (20:14 in NJPS) mentions the things that might be coveted in the order that a person has need of them, and what it behooves a person to try to acquire in this world. Therefore, the first coveted item mentioned is a person's house, then the person's spouse, then the person's servants, and lastly the person's animals that do not speak. (5:18 in NJPS), however, mentions them in the order of the gravity of the sin and evil. The most evil coveting is that of another person's spouse, as in David's coveting of Bathsheba. Next in magnitude of evil comes coveting the house in which one's neighbor lives, lest the person evict the neighbor and take the neighbor's home. Next comes the neighbor's field, for although a person does not live there as in the house, it is the source of the neighbor's livelihood and inheritance, as in the affair of Ahab and the vineyard of Naboth the Jezreelite. After the field  (5:18 in NJPS) mentions servants, who Abravanel valued of lesser importance than one's field. Next come the neighbor's animals, who do not have the faculty of speech, and lastly, to include the neighbor's inanimate moveable property,  (5:18 in NJPS) says "and anything that is your neighbor's."

Maimonides noted that in nature, God created animals that develop gradually. For example, when a mammal is born, it is extremely tender, and cannot eat dry food, so God provided breasts that yield milk to feed the young animal, until it can eat dry food. Similarly, Maimonides taught, God instituted many laws as temporary measures, as it would have been impossible for the Israelites suddenly to discontinue everything to which they had become accustomed. So God sent Moses to make the Israelites (in the words of ) "a kingdom of priests and a holy nation." But the general custom of worship in those days was sacrificing animals in temples that contained idols. So God did not command the Israelites to give up those manners of service, but allowed them to continue. God transferred to God's service what had formerly served as a worship of idols, and commanded the Israelites to serve God in the same manner — namely, to build to a Sanctuary, to erect the altar to God's name ( (20:21 in NJPS), to offer sacrifices to God, to bow down to God, and to burn incense before God. By this Divine plan, God blotted out the traces of idolatry, and established the great principle of the Existence and Unity of God. But the sacrificial service, Maimonides taught, was not the primary object of God's commandments about sacrifice; rather, supplications, prayers, and similar kinds of worship are nearer to the primary object. Thus God limited sacrifice to only one temple (see ) and the priesthood to only the members of a particular family. These restrictions, Maimonides taught, served to limit sacrificial worship, and kept it within such bounds that God did not feel it necessary to abolish sacrificial service altogether. But in the Divine plan, prayer and supplication can be offered everywhere and by every person, as can be the wearing of tzitzit and tefillin (16) and similar kinds of service.

In modern interpretation
The parashah is discussed in these modern sources:

Exodus chapter 18

In , the qualities to be sought in the judges are moral probity and piety, whereas  stresses intellectual discernment.

Exodus chapter 19
Noting that Jewish tradition has not preserved a tradition about Mount Sinai's location, Plaut observed that had the Israelites known the location in later centuries, Jerusalem and its Temple could never have become the center of Jewish life, for Jerusalem and the Temple would have been inferior in holiness to the God's mountain. Plaut concluded that Sinai thus became in Judaism, either by design or happenstance, a concept rather than a place.

Fisch noted that in both cases, a father appears to issue a command, only one is called to hear the command, others stay at a distance in terror, the commandment is recorded, and the parties enter into a covenant.

Alter translated  to call for "an indigo twist" on the Israelites' garments. Alter explained that the dye was not derived from a plant, as is indigo, but from a substance secreted by the murex, harvested off the coast of Phoenicia. The extraction and preparation of this dye were labor-intensive and thus quite costly. It was used for royal garments in many places in the Mediterranean region, and in Israel it was also used for priestly garments and for the cloth furnishings of the Tabernacle. Alter argued that the indigo twist indicated the idea that Israel should become (in the words of ) a "kingdom of priests and a holy nation" and perhaps also that, as the covenanted people, metaphorically God's firstborn, the nation as a whole had royal status.

Did God evince a different conception of "the people" (including women) than Moses (apparently speaking only to men)? Or does Moses's statement reveal a cultural bias of the Biblical author?

Moshe Greenberg wrote that one may see the entire Exodus story as "the movement of the fiery manifestation of the divine presence."

Everett Fox noted that "glory" (kevod) and "stubbornness" (kaved lev) are leading words throughout the book of Exodus that give it a sense of unity.

Exodus chapter 20
Although Jewish tradition came to consider the words "I am the Lord your God" in  the first of the Ten Commandments, many modern scholars saw not a command, but merely a proclamation announcing the Speaker.

In 1980, in the case of Stone v. Graham, the Supreme Court of the United States held unconstitutional a Kentucky statute that required posting the Ten Commandments on the wall of each public classroom in the state. Thus the Court concluded that the pre-eminent purpose for posting the Ten Commandments on schoolroom walls was plainly religious.

Shubert Spero asked why the Ten Commandments do not mention sacrifices, Passover, or circumcision. Joseph Telushkin answered that the Ten Commandments testify that moral rules about relations between people are primary, and thus, “Morality is the essence of Judaism.”

In 1950, the Committee on Jewish Law and Standards of Conservative Judaism ruled: "Refraining from the use of a motor vehicle is an important aid in the maintenance of the Sabbath spirit of repose. Such restraint aids, moreover, in keeping the members of the family together on the Sabbath. However where a family resides beyond reasonable walking distance from the synagogue, the use of a motor vehicle for the purpose of synagogue attendance shall in no wise be construed as a violation of the Sabbath but, on the contrary, such attendance shall be deemed an expression of loyalty to our faith. . . . [I]n the spirit of a living and developing Halachah responsive to the changing needs of our people, we declare it to be permitted to use electric lights on the Sabbath for the purpose of enhancing the enjoyment of the Sabbath, or reducing personal discomfort in the performance of a mitzvah."

Commandments

According to Sefer ha-Chinuch, there are 3 positive and 14 negative commandments in the parashah:
To know there is a God
Not to believe in divinity besides God
Not to make an idol for yourself
Not to worship idols in the manner they are worshiped
Not to worship idols in the four ways we worship God
Not to take God's Name in vain.
To sanctify the Sabbath with Kiddush and Havdalah
Not to do prohibited labor on the Sabbath
To respect your father and mother
Not to murder
Not to commit adultery
Not to kidnap
Not to testify falsely
Not to covet another's possession
Not to make human forms even for decorative purposes
Not to build the altar with hewn stones
Not to climb steps to the altar.

In the liturgy
The second blessing before the Shema speaks of how God "loves His people Israel," reflecting the statement of  that Israel is God's people.

Reuven Hammer noted that Mishnah Tamid 5:1 recorded what was in effect the first siddur, as a part of which priests daily recited the Ten Commandments.

It is customary for listeners to stand while the reader chants the Ten Commandments in the synagogue, as if the listeners were themselves receiving the revelation at Sinai.

And following the Kabbalat Shabbat service and prior to the Friday evening (Ma'ariv) service, Jews traditionally read rabbinic sources on the observance of the Sabbath, including Genesis Rabbah 11:9.

The Kiddusha Rabba blessing for the Sabbath day meal quotes  (Exodus 20:8–11 in NJPS) immediately before the blessing on wine.

Among the zemirot or songs of praise for the Sabbath day meal, the song Baruch Kel Elyon, written by Rabbi Baruch ben Samuel, quotes  (Exodus 20:8 in NJPS) and in concluding paraphrases  (Exodus 20:10 in NJPS), saying "In all your dwellings, do not do work — your sons and daughters, the servant and the maidservant."

Similarly, among the zemirot for the Sabbath day meal, the song Yom Zeh Mechubad paraphrases  (Exodus 20:9–11 in NJPS), saying, "This day is honored from among all days, for on it rested the One Who fashioned the universe. Six days you may do your work, but the Seventh Day belongs to your God. The Sabbath: Do not do on it any work, for everything God completed in six days."

Many Jews study successive chapters of Pirkei Avot (Chapters of the Fathers) on Sabbaths between Passover and Rosh Hashanah. And Avot 3:6 quotes  (20:21 in NJPS) for the proposition that even when only a single person sits occupied with Torah, the Shechinah is with the student.

The Weekly Maqam
In the Weekly Maqam, Sephardi Jews each week base the songs of the services on the content of that week's parashah. For Parashah Yitro, Sephardi Jews apply Maqam Hoseni, the maqam that expresses beauty, which is especially appropriate in this parashah because it is the parashah where the Israelites receive the Ten Commandments.

Haftarah

Connection to the Parashah
Both the parashah and the haftarah recount God's revelation. Both the parashah and the haftarah describe Divine Beings as winged. Both the parashah and the haftarah report God's presence accompanied by shaking and smoke. And both the parashah and the haftarah speak of making Israel a holy community.

See also
Jethro in Rabbinic Literature

Notes

Further reading
The parashah has parallels or is discussed in these sources:

Ancient
Instructions of Shuruppak. Sumer, early 3rd millennium BCE. in, e.g., Bendt Alster. Wisdom of Ancient Sumer, pages 60–69. Capital Decisions Ltd, 2005. (analog to Ten Commandments).
Book of the Dead, chapter 125. Ancient Egypt, 1500–1400 BCE. In, e.g., E. A. Wallis Budge. The Egyptian Book of the Dead (The Papyrus of Ani) Egyptian Text, Transliteration and Translation, pages 195–205. New York: Dover Publications, 1967. (analog to Ten Commandments).

Biblical
 (punishing children for fathers' sin).
 (vows);  (vows).
 (punishing children for fathers' sin);  (vows).
 (sharing administrative duties);  (ten commandments);  (5:9 in NJPS) (punishing children for fathers' sin);  (vows);  (no capital punishment of children for fathers' sin).
 (keeping the Sabbath);  (universally observed Sabbath).
 (31:29–30 in NJPS) (not punishing children for fathers' sin).
 (not punishing children for fathers' sin);  (the just does not rob).
 (graven images).

Early nonrabbinic
Josephus. Antiquities of the Jews. 3:3:1 – 3:5:6. Circa 93–94. In, e.g., The Works of Josephus: Complete and Unabridged, New Updated Edition. Translated by William Whiston, pages 83–85. Peabody, Massachusetts: Hendrickson Publishers, 1987.

Classical rabbinic
Mishnah: Shabbat 5:1–4, 9:3; Nedarim 1:1–11:11; Bava Kamma 5:7; Sanhedrin 7:6; Makkot 1:3; Shevuot 1:1–8:6; Avodah Zarah 1:1–5:12; Avot 3:6, 5:6; Tamid 5:1. Land of Israel, circa 200 CE. In, e.g., The Mishnah: A New Translation. Translated by Jacob Neusner, pages 184, 190, 515, 598, 610, 660–72, 679, 686, 869. New Haven: Yale University Press, 1988.
Tosefta: Maaser Sheni 5:27; Shabbat 1:21; Sukkah 4:3; Megillah 3:5, 24; Sotah 4:1, 7:2; Bava Kamma 3:2–3, 4:6, 6:4, 14, 7:5, 9:7, 17, 20, 22, 26; Sanhedrin 3:2, 4:7, 12:3; Makkot 1:7; Shevuot 3:6, 8; Avodah Zarah 1:1–8:8; Arakhin 2:10, 5:9. Land of Israel, circa 250 CE. In, e.g., The Tosefta: Translated from the Hebrew, with a New Introduction. Translated by Jacob Neusner, volume 1, pages 330, 360, 579, 645, 650, 844, 860; volume 2, pages 962–63, 972, 978, 980, 987, 1001, 1004–06, 1150, 1159, 1185, 1201, 1232–34, 1261–93, 1499, 1514. Peabody, Massachusetts: Hendrickson Publishers, 2002.
Jerusalem Talmud: Berakhot 5a, 12b–13a, 39a, 50b, 87a; Peah 6b; Sheviit 1a, 2a; Terumot 64a; Bikkurim 23b; Shabbat 1a–113b; Eruvin 33b; Sukkah 3a, 24a; Rosh Hashanah 1b; Taanit 16b; Megillah 18b, 31b; Ketubot 19a, 27a; Nedarim 1a–42b; Nazir 25b, 39a; Sotah 32a, 37b; Gittin 44b; Kiddushin 11a, 21a; Sanhedrin 2a, 11b, 21a, 27a, 34b, 36a, 45b–46a, 48b, 50a, 52a, 67a, 71a, 74a; Makkot 1a, 2a, 8b; Shevuot 1a–49a; Avodah Zarah 1a–34b. Tiberias, Land of Israel, circa 400 CE. In, e.g., Talmud Yerushalmi. Edited by Chaim Malinowitz, Yisroel Simcha Schorr, and Mordechai Marcus, volumes 1–3, 6a, 8, 12–15, 17, 22, 24–26, 31, 33, 35, 37, 39–40, 44–49. Brooklyn: Mesorah Publications, 2005–2020.
Mekhilta of Rabbi Ishmael 47:1–57:1. Land of Israel, late 4th century. In, e.g., Mekhilta de-Rabbi Ishmael. Translated by Jacob Z. Lauterbach, volume 2, pages 271–354. Philadelphia: Jewish Publication Society, 1933, reissued 2004.
Mekhilta of Rabbi Simeon 20:3; 26:1; 34:2; 44:1–2; 46:1–57:3; 68:1–2; 74:4, 6; 77:4; 78:4; 82:1. Land of Israel, 5th century. In, e.g., Mekhilta de-Rabbi Shimon bar Yohai. Translated by W. David Nelson, pages 83–84, 113, 147, 186, 195–209, 212–58, 305, 347, 349, 359, 364, 372–73. Philadelphia: Jewish Publication Society, 2006.

Babylonian Talmud: Berakhot 6a–b, 12a, 20b, 33a, 45a, 54a, 57a, 64a; Shabbat 2a–157b; Pesachim 5b, 47b–48a, 54a, 63b, 106a, 117b; Yoma 4a, 86a; Sukkah 5a, 53a; Beitzah 5a–b, 15b; Rosh Hashanah 3a, 24a–b, 27a; Taanit 21b; Megillah 31a; Moed Katan 5a, 7b, 13a, 15a; Chagigah 3b, 6a, 12b–13a, 14a, 18a, 27a; Yevamot 46b, 62a, 79a; Ketubot 103a, 111a; Nedarim 18a, 20a, 38a; Nazir 45a; Sotah 31a, 33a, 38a, 42a; Gittin 57b; Kiddushin 2b, 30a–32a, 76b; Bava Kamma 54b, 74b, 99b; Bava Metzia 5b, 30b, 32a, 61b; Sanhedrin 2b, 7a–b, 10a, 15b–17a, 18a–b, 21b, 34b, 35b, 36b, 45a, 50a, 56b, 59b, 61a–62a, 63a, 67a, 86a–b, 94a, 99a; Makkot 2b, 4a–b, 7b, 8b, 10a, 13b; Shevuot 20b–21a, 29a, 30b–31a, 39a, 47b; Avodah Zarah 2a–76b; Horayot 4b, 8a; Zevachim 8a, 19a, 58a, 59a, 61b, 115b–16a; Menachot 5b; Chullin 110b; Arakhin 11a; Temurah 3a–b; Keritot 3b; Niddah 13b, 42a. Sasanian Empire, 6th century. In, e.g., Talmud Bavli. Edited by Yisroel Simcha Schorr, Chaim Malinowitz, and Mordechai Marcus, 72 volumes. Brooklyn: Mesorah Publications, 2006.

Medieval

Saadia Gaon. The Book of Beliefs and Opinions, Introduction 6; 2:12; 5:4, 6; 6:6; 9:2; 10:11. Baghdad, 933. Translated by Samuel Rosenblatt, pages 31–32, 128, 130, 219–20, 225–26, 254, 327–28, 385. New Haven: Yale Univ. Press, 1948.
Exodus Rabbah 27:1–29:9. 10th century. In, e.g., Midrash Rabbah: Exodus. Translated by S. M. Lehrman, volume 3, pages 321–45. London: Soncino Press, 1939.
Solomon ibn Gabirol. A Crown for the King, 29:357–58. Spain, 11th century. Translated by David R. Slavitt, pages 48–49. New York: Oxford University Press, 1998.

Rashi. Commentary. Exodus 18–20. Troyes, France, late 11th century. In, e.g., Rashi. The Torah: With Rashi's Commentary Translated, Annotated, and Elucidated. Translated and annotated by Yisrael Isser Zvi Herczeg, volume 2, pages 205–46. Brooklyn: Mesorah Publications, 1994.
Rashbam. Commentary on the Torah. Troyes, early 12th century. In, e.g., Rashbam's Commentary on Exodus: An Annotated Translation. Edited and translated by Martin I. Lockshin, pages 189–223. Atlanta: Scholars Press, 1997.
Judah Halevi. Kuzari. 1:87–91; 2:4; 3:39; 5:21. Toledo, Spain, 1130–1140. In, e.g., Jehuda Halevi. Kuzari: An Argument for the Faith of Israel. Introduction by Henry Slonimsky, pages 60–63, 87, 172, 290. New York: Schocken, 1964.
Abraham ibn Ezra. Commentary on the Torah. France, 1153. In, e.g., Ibn Ezra's Commentary on the Pentateuch: Exodus (Shemot). Translated and annotated by H. Norman Strickman and Arthur M. Silver, volume 2, pages 342–446. New York: Menorah Publishing Company, 1996.

Maimonides. Mishneh Torah, Sefer Mezikin, Hilkhot Gezelah va-Avedah, chapter 1, halachot 9–12. Egypt, circa 1170–1180. In, e.g., Mishneh Torah: Sefer Mezikin . Translated by Eliyahu Touger, pages 238–40. New York: Moznaim, Publishing, 1997.
Maimonides. The Guide for the Perplexed. Cairo, Egypt, 1190. In, e.g., Moses Maimonides. The Guide for the Perplexed. Translated by Michael Friedländer, pages 19, 23, 25, 32, 36, 60, 77, 96–97, 219, 221–23, 264, 305, 322–23, 327, 346, 352. New York: Dover Publications, 1956.

Hezekiah ben Manoah. Hizkuni. France, circa 1240. In, e.g., Chizkiyahu ben Manoach. Chizkuni: Torah Commentary. Translated and annotated by Eliyahu Munk, volume 2, pages 477A–516. Jerusalem: Ktav Publishers, 2013.
Nachmanides. Commentary on the Torah. Jerusalem, circa 1270. In, e.g., Ramban (Nachmanides): Commentary on the Torah. Translated by Charles B. Chavel, volume 2, pages 249–337. New York: Shilo Publishing House, 1973.

Zohar 2:67a–94a. Spain, late 13th century. In, e.g., The Zohar. Translated by Harry Sperling and Maurice Simon. 5 volumes. London: Soncino Press, 1934.
Bahya ben Asher. Commentary on the Torah. Spain, early 14th century. In, e.g., Midrash Rabbeinu Bachya: Torah Commentary by Rabbi Bachya ben Asher. Translated and annotated by Eliyahu Munk, volume 3, pages 1022–121. Jerusalem: Lambda Publishers, 2003.
Jacob ben Asher (Baal Ha-Turim). Commentary on the Torah. Early 14th century. In, e.g., Baal Haturim Chumash: Shemos/Exodus. Translated by Eliyahu Touger, edited and annotated by Avie Gold, volume 2, pages 715–54. Brooklyn: Mesorah Publications, 2000.
Isaac ben Moses Arama. Akedat Yizhak (The Binding of Isaac). Late 15th century. In, e.g., Yitzchak Arama. Akeydat Yitzchak: Commentary of Rabbi Yitzchak Arama on the Torah. Translated and condensed by Eliyahu Munk, volume 1, pages 394–437. New York, Lambda Publishers, 2001.

Modern
Abraham Saba. Ẓeror ha-Mor (Bundle of Myrrh). Fez, Morocco, circa 1500. In, e.g., Tzror Hamor: Torah Commentary by Rabbi Avraham Sabba. Translated and annotated by Eliyahu Munk, volume 3, pages 1020–68. Jerusalem, Lambda Publishers, 2008.
Isaac Abravanel. Commentary on the Torah. Italy, between 1492 and 1509. In, e.g., Abarbanel: Selected Commentaries on the Torah: Volume 2: Shemos/Exodus. Translated and annotated by Israel Lazar, pages 220–57. Brooklyn: CreateSpace, 2015. And excerpted in, e.g., Abarbanel on the Torah: Selected Themes. Translated by Avner Tomaschoff, pages 345–59. Jerusalem: Jewish Agency for Israel, 2007.
Obadiah ben Jacob Sforno. Commentary on the Torah. Venice, 1567. In, e.g., Sforno: Commentary on the Torah. Translation and explanatory notes by Raphael Pelcovitz, pages 372–93. Brooklyn: Mesorah Publications, 1997.
Moshe Alshich. Commentary on the Torah. Safed, circa 1593. In, e.g., Moshe Alshich. Midrash of Rabbi Moshe Alshich on the Torah. Translated and annotated by Eliyahu Munk, volume 2, pages 469–501. New York, Lambda Publishers, 2000.
Shlomo Ephraim Luntschitz. Kli Yakar. Lublin, 1602. In, e.g., Kli Yakar: Shemos. Translated by Elihu Levine, volume 2, pages 13–96. Southfield, Michigan: Targum Press/Feldheim Publishers, 2007.

Avraham Yehoshua Heschel. Commentaries on the Torah. Cracow, Poland, mid 17th century. Compiled as Chanukat HaTorah. Edited by Chanoch Henoch Erzohn. Piotrkow, Poland, 1900. In Avraham Yehoshua Heschel. Chanukas HaTorah: Mystical Insights of Rav Avraham Yehoshua Heschel on Chumash. Translated by Avraham Peretz Friedman, pages 160–73. Southfield, Michigan: Targum Press/Feldheim Publishers, 2004.
Thomas Hobbes. Leviathan, 2:20; 3:35, 36, 40, 42; 4:45. England, 1651. Reprint edited by C. B. Macpherson, pages 258, 444, 449, 464–65, 501–02, 504, 545–47, 672, 676. Harmondsworth, England: Penguin Classics, 1982.

Edward Taylor. "18. Meditation. Heb. 13.10. Wee Have an Altar." In Preliminary Meditations: First Series. Cambridge, Massachusetts: Early 18th century. In Harold Bloom. American Religious Poems, pages 21–22. New York: Library of America, 2006.
Chaim ibn Attar. Ohr ha-Chaim. Venice, 1742. In Chayim ben Attar. Or Hachayim: Commentary on the Torah. Translated by Eliyahu Munk, volume 2, pages 623–88. Brooklyn: Lambda Publishers, 1999.
Moses Mendelssohn. Sefer Netivot Hashalom (The "Bi'ur," The Explanation). Berlin, 1780–1783. In Moses Mendelssohn: Writings on Judaism, Christianity, and the Bible. Edited Michah Gottlieb, pages 219–28. Waltham, Massachusetts: Brandeis University Press, 2011.

Nachman of Breslov. Teachings. Bratslav, Ukraine, before 1811. In Rebbe Nachman's Torah: Breslov Insights into the Weekly Torah Reading: Exodus-Leviticus. Compiled by Chaim Kramer, edited by Y. Hall, pages 140–77. Jerusalem: Breslov Research Institute, 2011.
Emily Dickinson. Poem 564 (My period had come for Prayer —). Circa 1862. Poem 1260 (Because that you are going). Circa 1873. Poem 1591 (The Bobolink is gone —). Circa 1883. Poem 1719 (God is indeed a jealous God —). 19th century. In The Complete Poems of Emily Dickinson. Edited by Thomas H. Johnson, pages 274–75, 551–52, 659, 698. New York: Little, Brown & Company, 1960.

David Clarkson. "Soul Idolatry Excludes Men from Heaven." In The Practical Works of David Clarkson, Volume II, pages 299ff. Edinburgh: James Nichol, 1865. In David Clarkson. Soul Idolatry Excludes Men Out of Heaven. Curiosmith, 2010.
Samson Raphael Hirsch. The Pentateuch: Exodus. Translated by Isaac Levy, volume 2, pages 236–86. Gateshead: Judaica Press, 2nd edition 1999. Originally published as Der Pentateuch uebersetzt und erklaert. Frankfurt, 1867–1878.
Samson Raphael Hirsch. The Jewish Sabbath. Nabu Press, 2010. Originally published Germany, 19th Century.

Samuel David Luzzatto (Shadal). Commentary on the Torah. Padua, 1871. In, e.g., Samuel David Luzzatto. Torah Commentary. Translated and annotated by Eliyahu Munk, volume 2, pages 697–768. New York: Lambda Publishers, 2012.
Samson Raphael Hirsch. The Jewish Sabbath. Frankfurt, before 1889. Translated by Ben Josephussoro. 1911. Reprinted Lexington, Kentucky: CreateSpace Independent Publishing Platform, 2014.
G. Campbell Morgan. The Ten Commandments. Chicago: Fleming H. Revell Company, 1901. Reprinted BiblioLife, 2009.
Yehudah Aryeh Leib Alter. Sefat Emet. Góra Kalwaria (Ger), Poland, before 1906. Excerpted in The Language of Truth: The Torah Commentary of Sefat Emet. Translated and interpreted by Arthur Green, pages 105–09. Philadelphia: Jewish Publication Society, 1998. Reprinted 2012.

Franklin E. Hoskins. "The Route Over Which Moses Led the Children of Israel Out of Egypt." National Geographic. (December 1909): pages 1011–38.
Hermann Cohen. Religion of Reason: Out of the Sources of Judaism. Translated with an introduction by Simon Kaplan; introductory essays by Leo Strauss, pages 54, 156, 289, 302, 346–47, 433. New York: Ungar, 1972. Reprinted Atlanta: Scholars Press, 1995. Originally published as Religion der Vernunft aus den Quellen des Judentums. Leipzig: Gustav Fock, 1919.
Harold H. Rowley. Moses and the Decalogue. George H. Doran Co., 1919.

James Joyce. Ulysses, chapter 7 (Aeolus). Paris: Shakespeare and Company, 1922. Reprinted, e.g., Ulysses: The Corrected Text. Edited by Hans Walter Gabler with Wolfhard Steppe and Claus Melchior, pages 116–17. New York: Random House, 1986.
Maynard Owen Williams. "East of Suez to the Mount of the Decalogue: Following the Trail Over Which Moses Led the Israelites from the Slave-Pens of Egypt to Sinai." National Geographic. (December 1927): pages 708–43.
Alexander Alan Steinbach. Sabbath Queen: Fifty-four Bible Talks to the Young Based on Each Portion of the Pentateuch, pages 51–53. New York: Behrman's Jewish Book House, 1936.
A. M. Klein. "Sacred Enough You Are." Canada, 1940. In The Collected Poems of A.M. Klein, page 152. Toronto: McGraw-Hill Ryerson, 1974.

Thomas Mann. Joseph and His Brothers. Translated by John E. Woods, pages 257, 325, 612, 788. New York: Alfred A. Knopf, 2005. Originally published as Joseph und seine Brüder. Stockholm: Bermann-Fischer Verlag, 1943.
Thomas Mann, Rebecca West, Franz Werfel, John Erskine, Bruno Frank, Jules Romains, André Maurois, Sigrid Undset, Hendrik Willem van Loon, Louis Bromfield, Herman Rauchning. The Ten Commandments: Ten Short Novels of Hitler's War Against the Moral Code. Edited by Armin L. Robinson. New York: Simon and Schuster, 1943.
The Sabbath Anthology. Edited by Abraham E. Millgram. Philadelphia: The Jewish Publication Society, 1944; reprinted 2018..

Morris Adler, Jacob B. Agus, and Theodore Friedman. "Responsum on the Sabbath." Proceedings of the Rabbinical Assembly, volume 14 (1950), pages 112–88. New York: Rabbinical Assembly of America, 1951. In Proceedings of the Committee on Jewish Law and Standards of the Conservative Movement 1927–1970, volume 3 (Responsa), pages 1109–34. Jerusalem: The Rabbinical Assembly and The Institute of Applied Hallakhah, 1997.
Abraham Joshua Heschel. The Sabbath. New York: Farrar, Straus and Giroux, 1951. Reprinted 2005.
Morris Adler. The World of the Talmud, pages 28–29. B'nai B'rith Hillel Foundations, 1958. Reprinted Kessinger Publishing, 2007.

Umberto Cassuto. A Commentary on the Book of Exodus. Jerusalem, 1951. Translated by Israel Abrahams, pages 209–57. Jerusalem: The Magnes Press, The Hebrew University, 1967.
Johann J. Stamm and Maurice E. Andrew. The Ten Commandments in Recent Research. Naperville, Illinois: Alec R. Allenson, 1967.
Martin Buber. On the Bible: Eighteen studies, pages 80–121. New York: Schocken Books, 1968.
Anthony Phillips. Ancient Israel's Criminal Law: A New Approach to the Decalogue. Oxford: Basil Blackwell, 1970.
Eduard Nielsen. The Ten Commandments in New Perspective. Alec R. Allenson, 1968. Reprinted Hymns Ancient & Modern Ltd, 2012.
Anthony Phillips. Ancient Israel's Criminal Law: A New Approach to the Decalogue. Basil Blackwell, 1970.
W. Gunther Plaut. Shabbat Manual. New York: CCAR, 1972.
Harry M. Buck. "Worship, Idolatry, and God." In A Light unto My Path: Old Testament Studies in Honor of Jacob M. Myers. Edited by Howard N. Bream, Ralph D. Heim, and Carey A. Moore, pages 67–82. Philadelphia: Temple University Press, 1974.
Harvey Arden. "In Search of Moses." National Geographic. (January 1976): pages 2–37.
Peter C. Craigie. The Problem of War in the Old Testament, page 55. Grand Rapids, Michigan: William B. Eerdmans Publishing Company, 1978.
Elie Munk. The Call of the Torah: An Anthology of Interpretation and Commentary on the Five Books of Moses. Translated by E.S. Mazer, volume 2, pages 230–91. Brooklyn: Mesorah Publications, 1995. Originally published as La Voix de la Thora. Paris: Fondation Samuel et Odette Levy, 1981.
Robert Goodman. "Shabbat." In Teaching Jewish Holidays: History, Values, and Activities, pages 1–19. Denver: A.R.E. Publishing, 1997.
Walter J. Harrelson. The Ten Commandments and Human Rights. Philadelphia: Fortress Press, 1980. Revised edition. Mercer University Press, 1997.
Harvey Arden. "Eternal Sinai." National Geographic, volume 161 (number 4) (April 1982): pages 420–61.
Pinchas H. Peli. Torah Today: A Renewed Encounter with Scripture, pages 71–74. Washington, D.C.: B'nai B'rith Books, 1987.
Robert A. Coughenour. "A Search for Maḥanaim." Bulletin of the American Schools of Oriental Research, number 273 (February 1989): pages 57–66.
David Noel Freedman. "The Nine Commandments: The secret progress of Israel's sins." Bible Review, volume 5 (number 6) (December 1989).
Mark S. Smith. The Early History of God: Yahweh and the Other Deities in Ancient Israel, pages 2, 23, 112, 148, 151, 155. New York: HarperSanFrancisco, 1990.
Harvey J. Fields. A Torah Commentary for Our Times: Volume II: Exodus and Leviticus, pages 42–50. New York: UAHC Press, 1991.
Pinchas H. Peli. The Jewish Sabbath: A Renewed Encounter. New York: Schocken, 1991.
Nahum M. Sarna. The JPS Torah Commentary: Exodus: The Traditional Hebrew Text with the New JPS Translation, pages 97–117. Philadelphia: Jewish Publication Society, 1991.
Moshe Weinfeld. "What Makes the Ten Commandments Different?" Bible Review, volume 7 (number 2) (April 1991).
Moshe Halbertal and Avishai Margalit. Idolatry. Translated by Naomi Goldblum. Cambridge, Massachusetts: Harvard University Press, 1992.

Nehama Leibowitz. New Studies in Shemot (Exodus), volume 1, pages 290–360. Jerusalem: Haomanim Press, 1993. Reprinted as New Studies in the Weekly Parasha. Lambda Publishers, 2010.
S.Y. Agnon. Present at Sinai: The Giving of the Law. Philadelphia: Jewish Publication Society, 1994.
Walter Brueggemann. "The Book of Exodus." In The New Interpreter's Bible. Edited by Leander E. Keck, volume 1, pages 823–62. Nashville: Abingdon Press, 1994.
Elliot N. Dorff. "Artificial Insemination, Egg Donation and Adoption." New York: Rabbinical Assembly, 1994. EH 1:3.1994. In Responsa: 1991–2000: The Committee on Jewish Law and Standards of the Conservative Movement. Edited by Kassel Abelson and David J. Fine, pages 461, 483, 506. New York: Rabbinical Assembly, 2002. (duty of the children of artificial insemination to honor their social parents; implications of the duty to honor parents for single parenthood).
Judith S. Antonelli. "The House of Jacob." In In the Image of God: A Feminist Commentary on the Torah, pages 175–184. Northvale, New Jersey: Jason Aronson, 1995.
Elliot N. Dorff. "Jewish Businesses Open on Shabbat and Yom Tov: A Concurring Opinion." New York: Rabbinical Assembly, 1995. OH 242.1995c. In Responsa: 1991–2000: The Committee on Jewish Law and Standards of the Conservative Movement. Edited by Kassel Abelson and David J. Fine, pages 64–70. New York: Rabbinical Assembly, 2002.
Elliot N. Dorff. "Family Violence." New York: Rabbinical Assembly, 1995. HM 424.1995. In Responsa: 1991–2000: The Committee on Jewish Law and Standards of the Conservative Movement. Edited by Kassel Abelson and David J. Fine, pages 773, 786. New York: Rabbinical Assembly, 2002. (implications of the commandment to honor one's parents for a duty to provide for dependent parents).
Ellen Frankel. The Five Books of Miriam: A Woman's Commentary on the Torah, pages 116–20. New York: G. P. Putnam's Sons, 1996.
Marc Gellman. God's Mailbox: More Stories About Stories in the Bible, pages 47–67. New York: Morrow Junior Books, 1996.
W. Gunther Plaut. The Haftarah Commentary, pages 167–77. New York: UAHC Press, 1996.
Mark Dov Shapiro. Gates of Shabbat: A Guide for Observing Shabbat. New York: CCAR Press, 1996.
Elliot N. Dorff. "Assisted Suicide." New York: Rabbinical Assembly, 1997. YD 345.1997a. In Responsa: 1991–2000: The Committee on Jewish Law and Standards of the Conservative Movement. Edited by Kassel Abelson and David J. Fine, pages 379, 380. New York: Rabbinical Assembly, 2002. (implications of God's ownership of the universe for assisted suicide).
Sorel Goldberg Loeb and Barbara Binder Kadden. Teaching Torah: A Treasury of Insights and Activities, pages 113–20. Denver: A.R.E. Publishing, 1997.
Baruch J. Schwartz. "What Really Happened at Mount Sinai? Four biblical answers to one question." Bible Review, volume 13 (number 5) (October 1997).
William H.C. Propp. Exodus 1–18, volume 2, pages 622–35. New York: Anchor Bible, 1998.
Susan Freeman. Teaching Jewish Virtues: Sacred Sources and Arts Activities, pages 69–84, 136–48, 195–227. Springfield, New Jersey: A.R.E. Publishing, 1999. (12–13, 16 (20:9, 13–14, 17 in NJPS)).
Exodus to Deuteronomy: A Feminist Companion to the Bible (Second Series). Edited by Athalya Brenner, pages 21, 34–35, 37, 39, 70, 163–64, 166, 170. Sheffield: Sheffield Academic Press, 2000.
David Noel Freedman. The Nine Commandments: Uncovering a Hidden Pattern of Crime and Punishment in the Hebrew Bible. New York: Doubleday, 2000.
Judy Klitsner. "From the Earth's Hollow Space to the Stars: Two Patriarchs and Their Non-Israelite Mentors." In Torah of the Mothers: Contemporary Jewish Women Read Classical Jewish Texts. Edited by Ora Wiskind Elper and Susan Handelman, pages 262–88. New York and Jerusalem: Urim Publications, 2000. (comparison of Abraham and Melchizedek, Moses and Jethro).
Martin R. Hauge. The Descent from the Mountain: Narrative Patterns in Exodus 19–40. Sheffield: Journal for the Study of the Old Testament Press, 2001.
Avivah Gottlieb Zornberg. The Particulars of Rapture: Reflections on Exodus, pages 247–87. New York: Doubleday, 2001.
Lainie Blum Cogan and Judy Weiss. Teaching Haftarah: Background, Insights, and Strategies, pages 230–39. Denver: A.R.E. Publishing, 2002.
William J. Federer. The Ten Commandments & their Influence on American Law: A Study in History. Amerisearch, 2002.
Michael Fishbane. The JPS Bible Commentary: Haftarot, pages 107–14. Philadelphia: Jewish Publication Society, 2002.
Elie Kaplan Spitz. "Mamzerut." New York: Rabbinical Assembly, 2000. EH 4.2000a. In Responsa: 1991–2000: The Committee on Jewish Law and Standards of the Conservative Movement. Edited by Kassel Abelson and David J. Fine, pages 558, 562–63, 566. New York: Rabbinical Assembly, 2002. (implications of the prohibition of adultery and God's remembering wrongdoing until the third or fourth generation for the law of the mamzer).
Jules Gleicher. "Moses Dikastes." Interpretation: A Journal of Political Philosophy, volume 30 (number 2) (spring 2003): pages 119–56. (Moses as judge).
Joseph Telushkin. The Ten Commandments of Character: Essential Advice for Living an Honorable, Ethical, Honest Life, pages 52–59, 61–65, 76–80, 129–32, 177–80, 189–90, 204–06, 275–78. New York: Bell Tower, 2003.
Robert Alter. The Five Books of Moses: A Translation with Commentary, pages 416–34. New York: W.W. Norton & Co., 2004.
The Ten Commandments: The Reciprocity of Faithfulness. Edited by William P. Brown. Louisville, Kentucky: Westminster John Knox Press, 2004.
Jeffrey H. Tigay. "Exodus." In The Jewish Study Bible. Edited by Adele Berlin and Marc Zvi Brettler, pages 143–52. New York: Oxford University Press, 2004.
Professors on the Parashah: Studies on the Weekly Torah Reading Edited by Leib Moscovitz, pages 111–19. Jerusalem: Urim Publications, 2005.
Gerald J. Blidstein. Honor Thy Father and Mother: Filial Responsibility in Jewish Law and Ethics: Augmented Edition. New York: Ktav, 2006.
Walter J. Harrelson. The Ten Commandments for Today. Louisville, Kentucky: Westminster John Knox Press, 2006.
W. Gunther Plaut. The Torah: A Modern Commentary: Revised Edition. Revised edition edited by David E.S. Stern, pages 468–509. New York: Union for Reform Judaism, 2006.
William H.C. Propp. Exodus 19–40, volume 2A, pages 101–85. New York: Anchor Bible, 2006.
Suzanne A. Brody. "Shabbat" and "Talking at Sinai." In Dancing in the White Spaces: The Yearly Torah Cycle and More Poems, pages 51–57, 79. Shelbyville, Kentucky: Wasteland Press, 2007.

James L. Kugel. How To Read the Bible: A Guide to Scripture, Then and Now, pages 32, 233–59, 273, 291, 321, 325, 343–45, 355, 405, 413, 415, 418, 425–26, 439, 610, 650, 683. New York: Free Press, 2007.
Michael D. Matlock. "Obeying the First Part of the Tenth Commandment: Applications from the Levirate Marriage Law." Journal for the Study of the Old Testament, volume 31 (number 3) (March 2007): pages 295–310.
Joseph Blenkinsopp. "The Midianite-Kenite Hypothesis Revisited and the Origins of Judah." Journal for the Study of the Old Testament, volume 33 (number 2) (December 2008): pages 131–53.
Adam Potkay. "Icons and Iconoclasm from Moses to Milton." Lecture 3 in The Modern Scholar: The Bible and the Roots of Western Literature. Prince Frederick, Maryland: Recorded Books, 2008.
The Torah: A Women's Commentary. Edited by Tamara Cohn Eskenazi and Andrea L. Weiss, pages 407–26. New York: URJ Press, 2008.
Menachem Creditor. "The Necessity of Windows: Parashat Yitro (Exodus 18:1–20:26)." In Torah Queeries: Weekly Commentaries on the Hebrew Bible. Edited by Gregg Drinkwater, Joshua Lesser, and David Shneer; foreword by Judith Plaskow, pages 93–97. New York: New York University Press, 2009.
Thomas B. Dozeman. Commentary on Exodus, pages 398–515. Grand Rapids, Michigan: William B. Eerdmans Publishing Company, 2009.
Bruce Feiler. America's Prophet: Moses and the American Story, pages _–_. New York: William Morrow, 2009. (eagles' wings).
Reuven Hammer. Entering Torah: Prefaces to the Weekly Torah Portion, pages 101–06. New York: Gefen Publishing House, 2009.
Timothy Keller. Counterfeit Gods: The Empty Promises of Money, Sex, and Power, and the Only Hope that Matters. Dutton Adult, 2009. (What is an idol? It is anything more important to you than God, anything that absorbs your heart and imagination more than God, anything you seek to give you what only God can give.).
Frank Newport. "Extramarital Affairs, Like Sanford's, Morally Taboo: Recent Confessions of Affairs by Elected Officials Fly in Face of Americans' Normative Standards" Gallup Inc. June 25, 2009.
Ziv Hellman. "And on the Seventh Day: Israelis ponder the public nature of the Shabbath in a state that seeks to be both Jewish and democratic." The Jerusalem Report, volume 20 (number 19) (January 4, 2009): pages 26–30.
Rebecca G.S. Idestrom. "Echoes of the Book of Exodus in Ezekiel." Journal for the Study of the Old Testament, volume 33 (number 4) (June 2009): pages 489–510. (Motifs from Exodus found in Ezekiel, including the call narrative, divine encounters, captivity, signs, plagues, judgment, redemption, tabernacle/temple, are considered.).
Patrick D. Miller. The Ten Commandments: Interpretation: Resources for the Use of Scripture in the Church. Louisville, Kentucky: Westminster John Knox Press, 2009.
Bruce Wells. "Exodus." In Zondervan Illustrated Bible Backgrounds Commentary. Edited by John H. Walton, volume 1, pages 224–36. Grand Rapids, Michigan: Zondervan, 2009.
"Day of Rest: Judith Shulevitz's New Book Considers the Sabbath Throughout the Ages and in Her Own Life." Tablet Magazine. (March 15, 2010).
"Body Image: An Art Historian Tackles the Thorny Matter of Jews and Figurative Painting." Tablet Magazine. (June 7, 2010). (the commandment not to make graven images and Jewish artists).

Adriane Leveen. "Inside Out: Jethro, the Midianites and a Biblical Construction of the Outsider." Journal for the Study of the Old Testament, volume 34 (number 4) (June 2010): pages 395–417.
Jonathan Sacks. Covenant & Conversation: A Weekly Reading of the Jewish Bible: Exodus: The Book of Redemption, pages 125–55. Jerusalem: Maggid Books, 2010.

Joe Lieberman and David Klinghoffer. The Gift of Rest: Rediscovering the Beauty of the Sabbath. New York: Howard Books, 2011.
United Nations Office on Drugs and Crime. Homicide Statistics. 2011.
The Decalogue through the Centuries: From the Hebrew Scriptures to Benedict XVI. Edited by Jeffrey P. Greenman and Timothy Larsen. Louisville, Kentucky: Westminster John Knox Press, 2012.
Micha Feldmann. On Wings of Eagles: The Secret Operation of the Ethiopian Exodus. Jerusalem: Gefen Publishing House, 2012. ( used to describe exodus of Ethiopian Jews).
Jonathan Haidt. The Righteous Mind: Why Good People Are Divided by Politics and Religion, page 256. New York: Pantheon, 2012. (prohibition of murder, adultery, false witness, and oath-breaking as an evolutionary advantage).

Shmuel Herzfeld. "You Shall Not (Be an Accessory to) Murder." In Fifty-Four Pick Up: Fifteen-Minute Inspirational Torah Lessons, pages 100–04. Jerusalem: Gefen Publishing House, 2012.
Torah MiEtzion: New Readings in Tanach: Shemot. Edited by Ezra Bick and Yaakov Beasley, pages 235–88. Jerusalem: Maggid Books, 2012.
Daniel S. Nevins. "The Use of Electrical and Electronic Devices on Shabbat." New York: Rabbinical Assembly, 2012.
Leon R. Kass. "The Ten Commandments: Why the Decalogue Matters." Mosaic Magazine. (June 2013).
Peter Berkowitz. "The Decalogue and Liberal Democracy: Response to: 'The Ten Commandments.'" Mosaic Magazine. (June 2013).
Amiel Ungar. "Tel Aviv and the Sabbath." The Jerusalem Report, volume 24 (number 8) (July 29, 2013): page 37.

Pope Francis. "No to the new idolatry of money." In Evangelii gaudium (The Joy of the Gospel). Vatican City: The Holy See, 2013.
Jacob E. Dunn. "A God of Volcanoes: Did Yahwism Take Root in Volcanic Ashes? Journal for the Study of the Old Testament, volume 38 (number 4) (June 2014): pages 387–424.
Amanda Terkel. "Glenn Grothman, Wisconsin GOP Senator, Fights for a Seven-Day Workweek." The Huffington Post. (January 3, 2014, updated January 23, 2014). (Congressional candidate said, "Right now in Wisconsin, you're not supposed to work seven days in a row, which is a little ridiculous because all sorts of people want to work seven days a week.")
Daniel Landes. "The quintessential convert: Why did Jethro need to embrace even more responsibility?" The Jerusalem Report, volume 24 (number 21) (January 27, 2014): page 47.
Ester Bloom. "The Crazy New App for Using Your iPhone on Shabbos."  Jewniverse. (October 1, 2014).
Simeon Chavel. "A Kingdom of Priests and its Earthen Altars in Exodus 19–24." Vetus Testamentum. Volume 65 (number 2) (2015): pages 169–222.
Jonathan Sacks. Lessons in Leadership: A Weekly Reading of the Jewish Bible, pages 85–88. New Milford, Connecticut: Maggid Books, 2015.
"The Crazy New Invention for Using Electricity on Shabbat."  Jewniverse. (April 21, 2015).
Jean-Pierre Isbouts. Archaeology of the Bible: The Greatest Discoveries From Genesis to the Roman Era, pages 114–20. Washington, D.C.: National Geographic, 2016.
Jonathan Sacks. Essays on Ethics: A Weekly Reading of the Jewish Bible, pages 103–08. New Milford, Connecticut: Maggid Books, 2016.
Shai Held. The Heart of Torah, Volume 1: Essays on the Weekly Torah Portion: Genesis and Exodus, pages 165–74. Philadelphia: Jewish Publication Society, 2017.
James L. Kugel. The Great Shift: Encountering God in Biblical Times, pages xiv, 154, 166, 170, 178, 180, 262–63, 317, 323, 349, 356, 367–68, 384. Boston: Houghton Mifflin Harcourt, 2017.
Steven Levy and Sarah Levy. The JPS Rashi Discussion Torah Commentary, pages 53–55. Philadelphia: Jewish Publication Society, 2017.
Pekka Pitkänen. "Ancient Israelite Population Economy: Ger, Toshav, Nakhri and Karat as Settler Colonial Categories." Journal for the Study of the Old Testament, volume 42 (number 2) (December 2017): pages 139–53.
John Barton. "The Ten Commandments." In A History of the Bible, pages 77–79. New York: Viking Press, 2019.
Ralph Allan Smith. "The Third Commandment in Deuteronomy 14:1–21."
Timothy Hogue. "The Monumentality of the Sinaitic Decalogue: Reading Exodus 20 in Light of Northwest Semitic Monument-Making Practices." Journal of Biblical Literature, volume 138, number 1 (2019): pages 79–99.
Julia Rhyder. "Sabbath and Sanctuary Cult in the Holiness Legislation: A Reassessment." Journal of Biblical Literature, volume 138, number 4 (2019): pages 721–40.

External links

Texts
Masoretic text and 1917 JPS translation
Hear the parashah chanted
Hear the parashah read in Hebrew

Commentaries

Academy for Jewish Religion, California
Academy for Jewish Religion, New York
Aish.com
Akhlah: The Jewish Children's Learning Network 
Aleph Beta Academy
American Jewish University — Ziegler School of Rabbinic Studies
Anshe Emes Synagogue, Los Angeles
Ari Goldwag 
Ascent of Safed
Bar-Ilan University
Bible Odyssey
Chabad.org
eparsha.com
G-dcast
The Israel Koschitzky Virtual Beit Midrash 
Jewish Agency for Israel
Jewish Theological Seminary
Kabbala Online
Mechon Hadar
Miriam Aflalo 
MyJewishLearning.com
Ohr Sameach
Orthodox Union
OzTorah, Torah from Australia
Oz Ve Shalom — Netivot Shalom 
Pardes from Jerusalem
Professor James L. Kugel
Professor Michael Carasik
Rabbi Dov Linzer
Rabbi Fabian Werbin
Rabbi Jonathan Sacks
Rabbi Shlomo Riskin 
Rabbi Shmuel Herzfeld
Rabbi Stan Levin
Reconstructionist Judaism 
Sephardic Institute 
Shiur.com
613.org Jewish Torah Audio 
Tanach Study Center
Teach613.org, Torah Education at Cherry Hill
TheTorah.com
Torah from Dixie
Torah.org
TorahVort.com
Union for Reform Judaism
United Synagogue of Conservative Judaism 
What's Bothering Rashi?
Yeshivat Chovevei Torah
Yeshiva University

Weekly Torah readings in Shevat
Weekly Torah readings from Exodus
Jethro (biblical figure)